Sanjula Abeywickreme (born 13 February 1999) is a Sri Lankan cricketer. He made his List A debut for Ratnapura District in the 2016–17 Districts One Day Tournament on 22 March 2017. He made his first-class debut for Lankan Cricket Club in Tier B of the 2018–19 Premier League Tournament on 10 February 2019.

References

External links
 

1999 births
Living people
Sri Lankan cricketers
Lankan Cricket Club cricketers
Ratnapura District cricketers
Cricketers from Colombo